All Fun and Games until Somebody Loses an Eye is the ninth novel by Scottish writer Christopher Brookmyre.

Plot summary
Jane Fleming, a 46-year-old housewife and grandmother, lives a quiet life in suburban East Kilbride. All that changes when her son, Ross, who works in the arms industry, is forced into hiding when his latest research attracts unwanted attention. Aided by the mysterious Bett, Jane must confront drug dealers, assassins and ruthless arms dealers in order to save her son.

Awards
All Fun And Games Until Somebody Loses an Eye was the winner of the seventh Bollinger Everyman Wodehouse Prize for Comic Fiction in 2006.

References

External links
  Observer review May 2005

2005 British novels
Novels by Christopher Brookmyre
Little, Brown and Company books
Novels set in Scotland
East Kilbride